Mount Eaton is a village in Wayne County, Ohio, United States. The population was 241 at the 2010 census.

History
Mount Eaton was platted in 1814.

Located near Mount Eaton is the historic James Akey Farm, also known as the "Stark Wilderness Center Pioneer Farm"; it is listed on the National Register of Historic Places. It was once a mining town and is built above many mines. A man was mowing his yard and his mower fell in a hole, which turned out to be an old mine.

Geography
Mount Eaton is located at  (40.695200, -81.703132).

Demographics

85.0% spoke English, 10.0% Dutch, and 5.0% Pennsylvania Dutch as their first language.

2010 census
As of the census of 2010, there were 241 people, 93 households, and 62 families living in the village. The racial makeup of the village was 98.8% White, 0.4% from other races, and 0.8% from two or more races. Hispanic or Latino of any race were 0.4% of the population.

There were 93 households, of which 29.0% had children under the age of 18 living with them, 53.8% were married couples living together, 7.5% had a female householder with no husband present, 5.4% had a male householder with no wife present, and 33.3% were non-families. 28.0% of all households were made up of individuals, and 9.7% had someone living alone who was 65 years of age or older. The average household size was 2.59 and the average family size was 3.26.

The median age in the village was 36.5 years. 24.9% of residents were under the age of 18; 10.3% were between the ages of 18 and 24; 24.4% were from 25 to 44; 27.8% were from 45 to 64; and 12.4% were 65 years of age or older. The gender makeup of the village was 48.1% male and 51.9% female.

2000 census
As of the census of 2000, there were 246 people, 89 households, and 60 families living in the village. The population density was 1,502.5 people per square mile (593.6/km2). There were 99 housing units at an average density of 604.7 per square mile (238.9/km2). The racial makeup of the village was 99.19% White, 0.41% African American, 0.41% Native American and 1.00% Pacific Islander.

There were 89 households, out of which 36.0% had children under the age of 18 living with them, 61.8% were married couples living together, 4.5% had a female householder with no husband present, and 31.5% were non-families. 28.1% of all households were made up of individuals, and 10.1% had someone living alone who was 65 years of age or older. The average household size was 2.76 and the average family size was 3.46.

In the village, the population was spread out, with 28.9% under the age of 18, 12.2% from 18 to 24, 26.8% from 25 to 44, 21.5% from 45 to 64, and 10.6% who were 65 years of age or older. The median age was 32 years. For every 100 females there were 98.4 males. For every 100 females age 18 and over, there were 103.5 males.

The median income for a household in the village was $45,357, and the median income for a family was $46,827. Males had a median income of $32,188 versus $23,333 for females. The per capita income for the village was $16,939. None of the families and 0.4% of the population were living below the poverty line.

References

External links
Village website

Villages in Wayne County, Ohio
Villages in Ohio
Amish in Ohio